Abot Hanggang Sukdulan is a 1989 Filipino drama film directed by Eddie Rodriguez. The film stars Snooky Serna, Tonton Gutierrez, Ricky Davao and Vina Morales.

Cast
 Snooky Serna as Agnes
 Tonton Gutierrez as Joe Mari
 Ricky Davao as Romano
 Cathy Mora as Karen
 Vina Morales as Carmi
 Richard Reynoso as June
 Laurice Guillen as Dory
 Robert Arevalo as Ernesto
 Subas Herrero as Pol
 Rosemarie Gil as Inday
 Imelda Ilanan as Veronica
 Ernie Zarate as Judge
 Gammy Viray as Mr. Bondok
 Koko Trinidad as VP
 Rez Cortez as Rocky
 Manjo del Mundo as Mark
 Jordan Catillo as Guz
 Joey Galvez as Announcer
 Augusto Victa as Attorney
 Angelo de Vera as Baby

Awards

References

External links

1989 films
Filipino-language films
Philippine drama films
Viva Films films
Films directed by Eddie Rodriguez